Tranquilizer Gun (Puška za uspavljivanje) is a 1997 Croatian film directed by  and starring Rene Medvešek, Alma Prica, Jelena Miholjević, and Nina Violić.

Plot
Janko (Medvešek), a police officer, meets Marta (Prica), a widow of Karlo Štajner, a war profiteer who left his business in disarray. Janko can't decide between Marta and Nana (Violić), his kleptomaniac wife. Janko's affair with Marta unwittingly gets him involved in a complex criminal plot.

Cast 

 Rene Medvešek as Janko
 Alma Prica as Marta
 Nina Violić as Nana

Reception
The critics praised the actors and the film's visual style, but found it lacking in energy and suffering from an overly complicated plot towards the end.

Tranquilizer Gun did not find success either at the Pula Film Festival or the Croatian box office - partly due to inadequate promotion - but received the 1998 Oktavijan Award from the Croatian Association of Film Critics.

References

External links
 

1997 films
1990s Croatian-language films
Croatian drama films
1997 drama films